The 2016–17 Albany Great Danes men's basketball team represented the University at Albany, SUNY during the 2016–17 NCAA Division I men's basketball season. The Great Danes, led by 16th-year head coach Will Brown, played their home games at SEFCU Arena as members of the America East Conference. They finished the season 21–14, 10–6 in America East play to finish in a tie for third place. Due to tiebreakers, they received the No. 3 seed in the America East tournament where they defeated Hartford and Stony Brook to advance to the Championship game where they lost to Vermont. They were invited to the CollegeInsider.com Postseason Tournament where they lost in the first round to Saint Peter's.

Previous season
The Great Danes finished the 2015–16 season 24–9, 13–3 in America East play to finish in second place. They lost in the quarterfinals of the America East tournament to Hartford. They were invited to the College Basketball Invitational where they lost in the first round to Ohio.

Preseason 
Albany was picked to finish third in the preseason America East poll. Joe Cremo was selected to the preseason All-America East team.

Departures

Incoming transfers

2016 incoming recruits
Albany did not have any incoming players in the 2016 recruiting class.

2017 incoming recruits

Roster

Schedule and results

|-
!colspan=12 style=| Non-conference regular season

|-
!colspan=12 style=| American East regular season

|-
!colspan=12 style=| America East tournament

|-
!colspan=12 style=| CIT

References

Albany Great Danes men's basketball seasons
Albany
Albany
Albany Great Danes men's basketball
Albany Great Danes men's basketball